Edith Elkind is an Estonian computer scientist who works as a professor of computing science at the University of Oxford and as a non-tutorial fellow of Balliol College, Oxford. She is known for her work in algorithmic game theory and computational social choice.

Education and career
As a high school student, Elkind competed for the Estonian team in the International Mathematical Olympiads in 1992 and 1993. 
She earned a master's degree at Moscow State University in 1998, and completed her Ph.D. in 2005 from Princeton University. Her dissertation, Computational Issues in Optimal Auction Design, was supervised by Amit Sahai.

After completing her Ph.D., she was a postdoctoral researcher at the University of Warwick, the University of Liverpool, and the Hebrew University of Jerusalem. She became a lecturer at the University of Southampton and an assistant professor at Nanyang Technological University before moving to Oxford in 2013. She was awarded the title of professor by Oxford in 2016.

Book
With Georgios Chalkiadakis and Michael J. Wooldridge, Elkind is an author of Computational Aspects of Cooperative Game Theory (Morgan & Claypool, 2012).

References

External links

Year of birth missing (living people)
Living people
Estonian women computer scientists
British computer scientists
Moscow State University alumni
Princeton University alumni
Academics of the University of Southampton
Academic staff of Nanyang Technological University
Academics of the University of Oxford
Fellows of Balliol College, Oxford
Fair division researchers